Converse is a city in Bexar County, Texas, United States,  northeast of downtown San Antonio. As of the 2020 census, it had a population of 27,466. It is part of the San Antonio Metropolitan Statistical Area.

In 2017, Converse proposed the annexation of 12 mi2 of territory near Randolph Air Force Base in northeastern Bexar County. Several large commercial areas are included in the annexation. The additional land would be taken in a series of phased expansions until 2033. Once completed, the area of Converse would triple in size. Municipal services would become available to an often neglected part of the county. The San Antonio City Council has unanimously approved the annexation; now the measure goes before the Converse City Council and the county commissioners.

History
Converse is on Farm Road 1976 thirteen miles northeast of downtown San Antonio in northeastern Bexar County. It was named for the chief engineer of the Southern Pacific Railroad, a Major Converse, who in 1877 bought a tract of land including the townsite. A post office was established in 1878, and by 1885 a population of thirty was reported. In 1896 the town had a saloon, two cotton gins, and a grocery. In 1990 the community, originally settled by German farmers, reportedly had the oldest 4-H Club in Texas. A singing society, the Salatrillo Liederkranz, had been active for many years. The population in 1946 was 175; by 1965 the town had twenty-two businesses and 900 residents. Over time Converse has become a suburb of San Antonio. In 1990 the community had a population of 8,887, and in 1991 it had seventy-three businesses. In 2000 the population had grown to 11,508 with 390 businesses.

Geography
Converse is located in eastern Bexar County. The Charles W. Anderson Loop highway around San Antonio passes along the eastern edge of Converse, separating it from Randolph Air Force Base. Converse is bordered by the cities of Live Oak and Universal City to the north, the city of Schertz to the southeast, and the city of San Antonio and unincorporated parts of Bexar County to the south and west.

Demographics

As of the 2020 United States census, there were 27,466 people, 8,435 households, and 6,176 families residing in the city. The population density was 1,818.3 people per square mile (701.9/km). The 4,009 housing units averaged 633.4 per square mile (244.5/km). Of the 8,435 households, 44.6% had children under the age of 18 living with them, 61.5% were married couples living together, 14.5% had a female householder with no husband present, and 19.8% were not families. About 15.5% of all households were made up of individuals, and 3.2% had someone living alone who was 65 years of age or older. The average household size was 2.94 and the average family size was 3.26.

In the city, the population was distributed as 31.0% under the age of 18, 8.0% from 18 to 24, 33.9% from 25 to 44, 20.8% from 45 to 64, and 6.4% who were 65 years of age or older. The median age was 32 years. For every 100 females, there were 95.5 males. For every 100 females age 18 and over, there were 89.2 males.

The median income for a household in the city was $47,947, and for a family was $49,396. Males had a median income of $32,631 versus $25,765 for females. The per capita income for the city was $18,949. About 4.9% of families and 6.5% of the population were below the poverty line, including 8.5% of those under age 18 and 10.5% of those age 65 or over.

Climate
The climate in this area is characterized by hot, humid summers and generally mild to cool winters. According to the Köppen climate classification system, Converse has a humid subtropical climate, Cfa on climate maps.

References

External links
 City of Converse official website

Cities in Texas
Cities in Bexar County, Texas
Greater San Antonio